Tough Nuts: Australia's Hardest Criminals is an Australian documentary television series narrated by Tara Moss. The series profiles a different Australian criminal in each episode from their childhood through to adulthood. The series features dramatised reconstructions of their most notorious crimes and interviews with persons who knew the criminals including former police officers, convicted criminals and their friends, together with forensic psychologists opinions.

The series was created and produced by the production company The Full Box and first screened on the Crime and Investigation Network in June 2010. A second season was screened in 2011. The series has been sold internationally.

Tough Nuts was nominated for Most Outstanding Documentary at the 2011 ASTRA awards.

The Nine Network bought the two seasons and re-branded the series as Australian Crime Stories which was broadcast in 2016 and 2017.

The Seven Network released the original series via video on demand on 7plus in 2019.

Episodes

Season 1 (2010)

Season 2 (2011)

References

2010 Australian television series debuts
2010s Australian crime television series
Australian factual television series
English-language television shows
2012 Australian television series endings